Niels Dall (born October 3, 1984 in Vejle) is an athlete from Denmark, who competes in archery.

2008 Summer Olympics
At the 2008 Summer Olympics in Beijing Dall finished his ranking round with a total of 634 points, which gave him the 53rd seed for the final competition bracket in which he faced defending Olympic Champion Marco Galiazzo in the first round. Galiazzo won the match by 114-97 and Dall was eliminated. Galiazzo would lose in the next round against Alan Wills.

Currently he is one of the best Breakout players in the world. He has already reached level 8 with a reduced paddle.

References

1984 births
Living people
Danish male archers
Archers at the 2008 Summer Olympics
Olympic archers of Denmark
Sportspeople from Aarhus
People from Vejle Municipality
Danish sports coaches
National team coaches
21st-century Danish people